Linda Pisti Basile Katehi-Tseregounis (born January 30, 1954) is a Greek-American engineering professor and former university administrator.

Katehi was elected a member of the National Academy of Engineering (2006) for contributions to three-dimensional integrated circuits and on-wafer packaging and to engineering education.

Katehi worked as the University of Illinois Urbana-Champaign's provost from 2006 to 2009 and dean of engineering at Purdue University from 2002 to 2006.

Beginning in 2009, she served as the sixth chancellor of the University of California, Davis.

On April 27, 2016, University of California President Janet Napolitano removed Katehi from her post and placed her on paid administrative leave pending an investigation into possible violations of university policies over nepotism. On August 9, 2016, the UC President announced that she had accepted Katehi's resignation after the investigation found "numerous instances where Chancellor Katehi was not candid, that she exercised poor judgment, and violated multiple University policies". Katehi remained in her post as electrical engineering professor.

Since the fall of 2019, Katehi has been Professor of Electrical and Computer Engineering at Texas A&M University, College Station.

Early life and education
Katehi was born in Athens and grew up on Salamis Island in Greece.  After graduating from high school, Katehi was admitted to the National Technical University of Athens.

In 1977, Katehi graduated with a degree in electrical engineering. She was one of the two women in her class of 189 students and has stated that this led to many difficulties and biases against her during that time. Katehi has stated that this motivated her to mentor women and other underrepresented minorities pursuing careers in engineering and the sciences.

Katehi has stated that she was drawn to electrical engineering as a teenager in 1969, when she watched Neil Armstrong’s Apollo 11 Moon landing. While captivated by the astronauts, she was most inspired by the engineers in mission control on Earth.

After two years working as a researcher at the Ministry of National Defense's Naval Research Lab in Athens, she was encouraged by a mentor to apply to graduate school at University of California, Los Angeles. She came to the United States in 1979. She went on to earn her master's degree and doctorate in electrical engineering at UCLA's Henry Samueli School of Engineering and Applied Sciences in 1981 and 1984, respectively.

Career
Katehi began her teaching career in Greece, as a lecturer.  She taught at the National Technical University of Athens Greece between 1977 and 1978.  She then became a researcher at the Ministry of National Defence's Naval Research Lab in Athens, Greece.

In her early US career, Katehi worked at the University of Michigan, Ann Arbor from 1984 to 2001 as a professor of electrical engineering and computer science, and as associate dean of academic affairs and graduate education starting in 1994. She was hired as the engineering dean at Purdue University in 2002. While there, she increased both the faculty by 15% and research funding within the engineering department. In 2005, Katehi became the first female provost and vice-chancellor of the University of Illinois at Urbana-Champaign. After four years at the University of Illinois, Katehi became the 6th Chancellor of the University of California, Davis in 2009, succeeding Larry Vanderhoef. She was the first female chancellor of the university.

Katehi's expertise is in circuit design and her research focuses on antennas.  She currently holds 19 patents. Through her academic roles she has been a mentor to over 70 postdoctoral fellows.

In addition to her university roles, Katehi was appointed by President George W. Bush to the committee on the National Medal of Science. She chaired the 12-member committee, along with the Secretary of Commerce's committee for the National Medal of Technology and Innovation, until 2010. She was appointed to the FBI's National Security Higher Education Advisory Board in 2010. Katehi is a fellow of the American Association for the Advancement of Science and in 2011, she was elected to the American Academy of Arts and Sciences. She is also a member of the National Academy of Engineering where she chaired the committee on K-12 engineering education for two years.

For her academic work, she has received awards including the AHC Aristeio Award in Academics in 2011 and a Gabby Award for her achievements in education and academia, also in 2011.

In 2014, she received an honorary degree from the American College of Greece as part of their annual commencement ceremony.

In 2015, the National Academy of Engineering presented Linda Katehi with its Simon Ramo Founders Award recognizing her "extraordinary impact on the engineering profession" and "leadership in engineering research and education."

In 2019, Katehi was hired as Professor at the Electrical and Computer Engineering Department at Texas A&M University, College Station.

Board memberships 
 Member of the Board of textbook publisher John Wiley & Sons
 Member of the Board of the Committee on Institutional Cooperation
 Member of the Board of The Cyprus Institute
 Member of the Board of Valley Vision
 Member of the Board of the Bay Area Council Economic Institute
 Member of the Board of the Business Higher Education Forum

University of California, Davis
Katehi was appointed chancellor by the University of California Board of Regents on May 7, 2009, effective August 17, 2009. She holds UC Davis faculty appointments in electrical and computer engineering and in women and gender studies. Katehi charged a committee with creating a new "Vision of Excellence" for the school. She also launched several blue ribbon committees: tech transfer and commercialization, research, information technology excellence, and organizational excellence. Katehi also created the Chancellor's Colloquium Distinguished Speaker Series As of 2009, Katehi's base annual salary was $400,000.

In response to demonstrations on campus in 2010, Katehi launched the Hate-Free Campus Initiative to reaffirm the campus's values and commitment to one another. The initiative included creation of "Beyond Tolerance Tuesday," collaboration with the Museum of Tolerance, and the creation of a speakers series and the Civility Project, which began with a grant from the National Endowment for the Humanities.

Under Katehi's leadership, UC Davis co-hosted the Governors' Global Climate Summit 3: Building the Green Economy in November 2010. Participants included Governor Arnold Schwarzenegger, the United Nations Development Programme, and the United Nations Environment Programme. The summit's focus was to continue to build subnational collaboration on policies and strategies to stimulate economic growth, reduce dependence on fossil fuels, create green jobs, promote clean energy solutions and reduce greenhouse gas pollution.

In 2013, Katehi launched the UC Davis World Food Center, with the publicly stated goal of amplifying UC Davis' numerous programs involved in food, health and sustainability.  In January 2015, she announced that UC Davis plans to build a new location for the World Food Center in downtown Sacramento.  The location could also serve as a satellite campus for UC Davis.  Katehi stated that a plan for the new location could be formed by the end of May or June.

In September 2014, Katehi announced a partnership between Mars, Incorporated and UC Davis to create the Innovation Institute for Food and Health.  According to Katehi, the institute will serve as the innovation branch of the UC Davis World Food Center.  Chief Science Officer at Mars Inc., Harold Schmitz, called the relationship both research and innovation-based.  Mars has pledged to contribute $40 million to the project over 10 years while UC Davis has committed to contribute $20 million over 10 years.  Additionally, Katehi announced a partnership with a government agency in Chile to expand research on a global level in conjunction with the UC Davis World Food Center.

Days after the announcement of the Mars partnership, Katehi and UC Davis announced that it will install a solar array on 70 acres of land south of Interstate 80.  The power plant will provide 14 percent of all UC Davis's power consumption.  The array will be built in conjunction with SunPower who previously built a 4-megawatt solar array at the UC Davis West Village neighborhood, which is a net-zero community.

Increasing the percentage of Latino students at UC Davis is a goal of the university, as stated by Katehi.  UC Davis aims to become a Hispanic Serving Institution by having at least 25% of their undergraduate student body made up of Latinos by the 2018–2019 school year.

In March, Katehi invited the public to participate in the construction of the Shrem Museum in UC Davis's Gateway District.  Participants were invited to sign a steel beam that would be installed and visible after construction.  Upon completion, the museum will house the UC Davis art collection which consists of over 5,000 items.

Administrative leave

On April 27, 2016, UC President Janet Napolitano placed Chancellor Katehi on investigatory administrative leave from her position as chancellor, pending the outcome of an investigation into multiple possible violations of several University of California policies.

According to Inside Higher Education (IHE) "Linda Katehi has held on as chancellor despite numerous controversies, but she is placed on leave over issues related to employing her daughter-in-law."  IHE continued stating: A letter from Napolitano to Katehi said that the chancellor's daughter-in-law has received "promotions and salary increases over a two-and-a-half-year period that have increased her pay by over $50,000 and have resulted in several title changes. During that same period, you put forward a pay increase of over 20 percent and a title change for your daughter-in-law's supervisor." Further, Napolitano's letter said, the academic program that employs Katehi's son has been moved into the department where her daughter-in-law works, and "placed under her direct supervision." The letter said that it "does not appear that appropriate steps were taken to address, document or obtain approval for the fact that your son now reported to your daughter-in-law, who, in turn, was supervised by one of your direct reports." An independent investigation will now be launched, Napolitano said."

In its 28 April 2016 article entitled "Probe of nepotism, conduct and lying targets UC Davis head", the San Francisco Chronicle reported: "Katehi’s daughter-in-law, Emily Prieto-Tseregounis, was hired as an executive analyst at UC Davis in 2013, earning $77,000. In less than three years, she was promoted to assistant vice chancellor earning $130,000, said Dianne Klein, a UC spokeswoman. In February, a UC attorney advised against promoting her again, Klein said. The daughter-in-law’s boss, Vice Chancellor Adela de la Torre, reports directly to Katehi, who raised de la Torre’s pay by 22 percent in July."  The San Francisco Chronicle further stated, as to 2009: "Questions swirled then about whether the new chancellor had known, in her previous job, about the improper admission of 800 under-qualified students to the University of Illinois at Urbana-Champaign, a prestigious public university where Katehi was provost and oversaw admissions."

Involvement in STEM
In August 2011, Katehi voiced her support of the California STEM Learning Network in her Huffington Post blog.  The California STEM Learning Network, otherwise known as CLSNet, was starting in 2008 with funding provided by the S.D. Bechtel Jr. Foundation and the Bill and Melinda Gates Foundation.  CLSNet promotes the importance of STEM fields as well as pushes to increase the number of students graduating high school with the intent to go into STEM fields in the state of California.

In September 2012, Katehi was awarded a $3.725 million grant over 5 years from the National Science Foundation to establish an ADVANCE program at UC Davis, with the goal of increasing female participation in science, technology, engineering and mathematics (STEM) education and careers. Katehi serves as the principal investigator and chairs the project's steering committee. According to UC Davis, the grant money will be used, in part, to create the Center for the Advancement of Multicultural Perspectives on Science (CAMPOS). The CAMPOS initiative's primary focus is increasing cultural diversity and supporting Latinas in STEM careers.

In October 2012, Katehi was included on the California STEM Learning Network's list of twelve "Leading Women in STEM." The Network recognized Katehi for her work in increasing STEM opportunities for women and girls and serving as a role model in the field.

In March 2013, Katehi was chosen to speak at the 26th annual Yolo County Women's History Month luncheon. Katehi also gave a keynote address about her work in STEM at the Consortium for Women and Research's annual Distinguished Women in Science Lecture Series in April 2013.

Resumption of academic work 
In July 2017, the Sacramento Bee reported that Katehi would begin teaching at UC Davis again in the 2017-18 academic year as a "distinguished professor". She would receive an equivalent salary to her salary as chancellor. Public interest experts criticized the move as atypical, noting that Katehi's salary would be higher than any other professor in her department, even those with full teaching loads. While UC Davis officials initially announced her position as being an engineering and gender studies professor, they revealed a few weeks later that she would only be teaching one engineering class every academic quarter. Salary experts again criticized the situation as inequitable in comparison with Katehi's high salary.

Controversies

University of Illinois clout scandal

Before coming to UC Davis, Katehi served as provost and vice chancellor for academic affairs at the University of Illinois at Urbana-Champaign from April 1, 2006, to June 2009. As the Provost, she oversaw all Colleges and Schools, the Library, HR, IT, facilities and was in charge of the university budget. She oversaw the admissions for UIUC during part of the time period (2003-2009) that came to be investigated under of the University of Illinois clout scandal. Katehi denied involvement, saying the "Category I" decisions were made at higher administrative levels. That was also confirmed by the findings as described in the report published by the investigative committee.

In August 2015, a federal judge allowed a spoliation of evidence claim to proceed against the University of Illinois at Urbana-Champaign in an action that was associated with the resignation of the Chancellor.  Rather than litigating the claim as to destroying evidence, the University of Illinois settled the action at cost of more than $2 million.

UC Davis pepper-spray incident

On November 18, 2011, Katehi requested Occupy movement protesters on the UC Davis campus remove their tents from the quad. When the group of peaceful protestors refused to move, campus police officers pepper sprayed them while they sat on the ground, linking arms. Eleven protesters received medical treatment; two were hospitalized. Katehi stated there had been "no option" except police action due to health and safety concerns, participation of some non-UC Davis persons in the protests, and some protestors' non-compliance with Katehi's earlier written and police's oral directions.  The incident led to further protests and calls for Katehi's resignation from some campus departments and organizations. UC Davis Academic Senate Chair Linda Bisson criticized Katehi's slow response in providing information and taking disciplinary action against police, but she said most faculty wanted Katehi to stay in her post while being held accountable in some way. An online petition asking her to resign gathered upwards of 100,000 signatures.

Katehi said she took "full responsibility for the incident" and placed two officers and the chief of campus police on administrative leave. Katehi stated that she would not step down, and she and State Assembly Speaker John A. Pérez requested an outside investigation. Mark G. Yudof appointed former Los Angeles Police Department Chief William J. Bratton to head the investigation. The Reynoso Task Force Report published in April 2012 reported that Katehi "failed to express in any meaningful way her expectation that the police operation was to be sharply limited so that no use of force would be employed by police officers other than their demand that the tents be taken down." On July 31, 2012, a UC Davis spokesman announced that John Pike, a police officer who pepper-sprayed students, was no longer employed by the university.

On April 13, 2016, the Sacramento Bee reported that the university's Office of Strategic Communications, whose budget was increased from $2.93 million in 2009 when Katehi came into office to $5.47 million in 2015, had paid $175,000 to public relations consultants "to scrub pepper spray references from [the] Internet" in order to repair the online image of Chancellor Katehi and the university. The revelation brought renewed attention to the incident, and additional criticism of Katehi. On August 9, 2016, the Sacramento Bee reported in a follow-up article that Katehi had once asked an aide to edit her Wikipedia page to protect her reputation. The story refers to an investigative report by Orrick, Herrington, and Sutcliffe, LLP requested by UC's Office of Ethics, Compliance and Audit Services, entitled Independent Review of Allegations Related to Chancellor Linda Katehi, which also found that, following the pepper-spray incident Katehi hired a public relations firm to "[improve] Chancellor Katehi’s personal narrative and online identity, primarily through her Wikipedia page." The report noted the firm was paid $44,600 for the service.

Conflict-of-interest in board memberships
During her tenure as chancellor of UC Davis, Katehi became embroiled in a controversy, detailed below, over her service on outside boards of directors ("moonlighting"). In March 2016, Katehi apologized for these activities. Student activists and protestors called for her resignation by holding a protest lasting more than a month at her office. She later apologized for the DeVry board membership, calling it an error, and promised to donate $200,000 of her Wiley stock proceeds, out of the $420,000 compensation for serving on their board, to an undergraduate scholarship fund at UC Davis. Several members of the California State Assembly, unsatisfied with her response, called for her resignation, while others remained neutral.<ref>"Assemblymember Dodd Lays Out Legislative Priorities" by The Vanguard Editorial Board, The Davis Vanguard, 26 March 2016</ref>

UC President Janet Napolitano called the DeVry board membership "a mistake," but said she did not consider it a ground for Katehi's resignation at the time. The California Aggie'' later reported that Napolitano has asked Linda Katehi to resign as the UC Davis Chancellor.

On April 1, 2016, hundreds of students walked out of classes and, with faculty, protested and called for the resignation of Katehi in a press conference. Protesters stated Katehi represents the "corporatization and privatization of [the] university," and that she has "failed to properly address racial and religious tensions on campus."

DeVry Education Group
Katehi faced criticism for her decision to join the board of the DeVry Education Group, a for-profit education corporation that offers online college degrees, at a time when DeVry was the subject of a federal investigation for misleading advertising practices. Katehi received $70,000 a year for her service on DeVry's board. Katehi had not received the permission of University of California president Janet Napolitano to serve on this board, as required by UC rules.

Some elected officials and fellow academics faulted Katehi for making personal profit from a firm whose practices and interests are in conflict with the values of public education that are central to the UC system; some saw the DeVry position as furthering a history of participation in ventures at odds with her responsibilities as chancellor of a public university. Katehi resigned from the board in late February 2016.

John Wiley and Sons
Katehi also served on the board of the textbook publisher John Wiley and Sons, which has been criticized for the high cost of textbooks, and which has a direct interest in the textbook choices made by UC Davis. She received $420,000 (in pay and stock) from Wiley and Sons as compensation for her services from 2012 to 2014. She cited correcting "the chronic lack of diversity on a number of boards" as a reason to join those boards. She served on this board with permission from the University of California.

In March 2016, Katehi said that she would donate all stock proceeds earned while serving on Wiley's board to a UC Davis scholarship fund. In July 2016, Katehi's personal spokesman Larry Kamer stated  "Given the state of events, Chancellor Katehi and her family will consider their options regarding charitable donations at the conclusion of the investigation,"

King Abdulaziz University of Saudi Arabia
Katehi served on the board of King Abdulaziz University of Saudi Arabia.

References

Bibliography

Peer-reviewed papers

Other

External links
Professor at the Department of Electrical and Computer Engineering, Texas A&M University
Davis Wiki: Linda Katehi

University of California, Davis: Former Chancellor Linda P.B. Katehi
UCDavis.edu: Linda Katehi's Blog
California STEM Summit 2012: Leading Women In STEM 
Huffington Post: Linda Katehi's posts 
Maria Shriver blog: Linda Katehi's posts
Saudi-U.S. Relations Information Service Experts: Linda Katehi
UCLA Engineering Distinguished Alumnus: Linda Katehi

Greek engineers
American women engineers
1954 births
Living people
Expatriate academics in the United States
Greek emigrants to the United States
Chancellors of the University of California, Davis
Fellows of the American Academy of Arts and Sciences
Members of the United States National Academy of Engineering
National Technical University of Athens alumni
University of Michigan faculty
UCLA Henry Samueli School of Engineering and Applied Science alumni
People from Davis, California
21st-century women engineers
20th-century women engineers
Engineers from California
Greek women engineers
Women heads of universities and colleges
People from Attica
American women academics
21st-century American women